The Lone Ranger is a 1956 Western film based on The Lone Ranger television series, starring Clayton Moore and Jay Silverheels. The Lone Ranger was the first of two theatrical features based on the TV series of the same name; the other one being The Lone Ranger and the Lost City of Gold (1958). This 1956 film was Bonita Granville's last credited film appearance. She had retired from the screen to marry Jack Wrather in 1947.

Plot
Set in the American Southwest, the territorial governor enlists the help of the Lone Ranger to investigate mysterious raids on white settlers by Indians who ride with saddles. Wealthy rancher Reese Kilgore (Lyle Bettger) wants to expand his land to include Spirit Mountain, which is sacred to the local tribes. The Lone Ranger realizes the natives wanted to keep settlers away so they would not discover the rich silver deposits on Spirit Mountain, while Kilgore wants to encourage a war between settlers and natives so that he can mine the mountain himself. Working with Chief Red Hawk, the governor, Tonto, a cowboy named Ramirez, and a humorous disguise, the Lone Ranger discovers the true identities of the raiders, prevents war, protects the tribal lands, and rescues Kilgore's daughter from captivity.

Cast
 Clayton Moore as The Lone Ranger
 Jay Silverheels as Tonto
 Lyle Bettger as Reese Kilgore
 Bonita Granville as Welcome Kilgore
 Perry Lopez as Pete Ramirez
 Robert J. Wilke as Cassidy
 John Pickard as Sheriff Sam Kimberley
 Beverly Washburn as Lila Kilgore
 Michael Ansara as Angry Horse
 Frank DeKova  as Chief Red Hawk
 Charles Meredith as Governor
 Mickey Simpson as Powder
 Lane Chandler as Chip Walker
 Zon Murray as Goss

Production
Parts of the film were shot in Kanab Canyon, Barracks Canyon, and Johnson Canyon in Utah.

Accolades
The Lone Ranger was nominated for the American Film Institute's list AFI's 100 Years...100 Heroes & Villains as a hero, while his line "Hi-Yo, Silver!" was nominated for the 2005 list AFI's 100 Years...100 Movie Quotes.

See also
List of American films of 1956

References

External links
 
 
 
 

1956 films
1956 Western (genre) films
Lone Ranger films
1950s English-language films
Warner Bros. films
Films directed by Stuart Heisler
Films scored by David Buttolph
American Western (genre) films
Films shot in Utah
Films adapted into comics
1950s American films